Nikola Nikezić (born 13 June 1981) is a Montenegrin former professional footballer.

Club career
He also played for Domžale and Gorica in the Slovenian PrvaLiga and FK Budućnost Podgorica and FK Sutjeska Nikšić in the First League of Serbia and Montenegro. On 15 March 2010 Nikezic ended his experience with Le Havre AC, the striker decided to quit the French team and signed a deal with the Russian side FC Kuban Krasnodar. His contract with Kuban was supposed to run until November 2011. However, in early 2011, FC Kuban decided they want to buy different players in his position and tried to force him to dissolve the contract by mutual consent. When he refused, he was beaten up by unknown persons, allegedly with ties to the Russian mafia, at the club office to force him to sign the contract dissolution papers. After being beaten for 20 minutes, by two armed men, he did sign the paperwork. He filed a complaint with FIFA president Sepp Blatter couple of days after the incident, with attached photos of bruises sustained during the beating. Eventually FIFPro (International Federation of Professional Footballers), with the assistance of Russian Football Union, forced the club to pay Nikezić a compensation of 180,000 euros.

International career
He was part of the Serbia and Montenegro squad at the 2004 Summer Olympics, that exited in the first round, finishing fourth in Group C behind gold-medal winners Argentina, Australia and Tunisia. He made his senior debut for Montenegro as a late substitute in an October 2007 friendly match against Estonia. It remained his sole international appearance.

Notes

References

External links

PrvaLiga profile 

1981 births
Living people
Footballers from Podgorica
Association football forwards
Serbia and Montenegro footballers
Serbia and Montenegro under-21 international footballers
Olympic footballers of Serbia and Montenegro
Footballers at the 2004 Summer Olympics
Montenegrin footballers
Montenegro international footballers
FK Budućnost Podgorica players
FK Bokelj players
FK Sutjeska Nikšić players
NK Domžale players
ND Gorica players
Le Havre AC players
FC Kuban Krasnodar players
NK Olimpija Ljubljana (2005) players
Nikola Nikezic
First League of Serbia and Montenegro players
Second League of Serbia and Montenegro players
Slovenian PrvaLiga players
Ligue 2 players
Ligue 1 players
Russian First League players
Nikola Nikezic
Expatriate footballers in Slovenia
Serbia and Montenegro expatriate sportspeople in Slovenia
Montenegrin expatriate footballers
Montenegrin expatriate sportspeople in Slovenia
Expatriate footballers in France
Montenegrin expatriate sportspeople in France
Expatriate footballers in Russia
Montenegrin expatriate sportspeople in Russia
Expatriate footballers in Thailand
Montenegrin expatriate sportspeople in Thailand